The Book News Monthly was a monthly journal published by John Wanamaker from 1882 to 1918. It was called Book News: A Monthly Survey until 1906.

References

Magazines established in 1882
Magazines disestablished in 1918
1882 establishments in Pennsylvania
1918 disestablishments in Pennsylvania
Monthly magazines published in the United States
Book review magazines
Literary magazines published in the United States
Magazines published in Philadelphia